Consuming Fire is a live Christian worship music album by Darrell Evans and friends released in April 2004. It was recorded at World Revival Church in Kansas City, MO and Trinity Church in Amarillo, TX.

Track listing 
"Worship Intro" - 1:59
"Consuming Fire" (Darrell Evans) - 3:30
"Jesus I Come to Follow" (Evans) - 5:22
"Anywhere with You" (Evans) - 4:16
"Precious Jesus" (with Kate Miner) (Evans) - 5:31
"Exalted" (with Charlie Hall) (Evans) - 4:33
"Blessed Be the Lord" (Evans) - 3:54
"My Everything" (Evans and Andre Gonzalez) - 3:31
"Fields of Grace" (with Mike Weaver of Big Daddy Weave) (Evans) - 4:26
"My Reward" (with Paul Baloche)  (Paul Baloche) - 4:20
"The One and Only" (Evans) - 4:36
"Just As I Am" (Evans) - 4:50
"Harp in My Heart" (with Kevin Prosch) (Kevin Prosch) - 8:33
"Dream Before You" (with Kate Miner) (Music: Kate Miner; Words: Judie Lawson) - 5:35
"Let the River Flow 2" (Evans) - 4:55

Personnel 
 Darrell Evans – lead vocals, acoustic guitars, arrangements
 Rob Gungor – keyboards, arrangements, backing vocals 
 Chad Copelin – organ
 Jeff Coleman – electric guitars 
 Brandon Culvey – electric guitars 
 Brian Hendrix – bass
 Gary Lunn – bass
 Trent Austin – drums 
 Rudy Royston – drums

Production 
 Darrell Evans – producer, executive producer
 Rick Shadle – executive producer
 Eric Conn – live sound recording, overdub recording, mastering 
 Kevin Prosch – mixing 
 Jon Schroeder – mix assistant 
 Randall Landis – layout, photography 
 Jim Kerkusz – photography

Darrell Evans (musician) albums
2004 live albums